The 2022–23 EuroCup Women is the 21st edition of FIBA Europe's second-tier international competition for women's basketball clubs under such name.

Teams

Schedule

Qualification round

Conference 1

|}

Conference 2

|}

Regular season

Conference 1

Group A

Group B

Group C

Group D

Group E

Group F

Conference 2

Group G

Group H

Group I

Group J

Group K

Group L

Ranking of third-placed teams

Conference 1

Conference 2

Seeding

Play-off Round 1

|}

Round of 16

|}

Quarterfinals

|}

Semifinals

|}

Final

|}

See also
 2022–23 EuroLeague Women

External links
 EuroCup Women website

References

EuroCup Women seasons
2022–23 in European women's basketball leagues
Current basketball seasons